Alibel Alegre-Smith (born 9 May 1983 in Jaca, Spain) is a Spanish former figure skater. She is the 2002-2003 Spanish national silver medalist .

Alegre-Smith, the daughter of a skating coach of John Curry, started skating in Jaca at the age of just 3 years old. After retiring from competitive skating at the age of 21, she began performing with Disney on Ice. She is currently touring in the "100 Years of Magic Show" along with her brother, Miguel.

External links
 

Spanish female single skaters
1983 births
Living people